Alfred A. Knopf, Inc. is an American publishing house that was founded by Alfred A. Knopf Sr. and Blanche Knopf in 1915. Blanche and Alfred traveled abroad regularly and were known for publishing European, Asian, and Latin American writers in addition to leading American literary trends. It was acquired by Random House in 1960, and is now part of the Knopf Doubleday Publishing Group division of Penguin Random House which is owned by the German conglomerate Bertelsmann. The Knopf publishing house is associated with its borzoi colophon, which was designed by co-founder Blanche Knopf in 1925.

History

Early years

1915–1920 
Knopf was founded in 1915 by Alfred A. Knopf Sr. along with Blanche Knopf, on a $5,000 advance from his father, Samuel Knopf. The first office was located in New York's Candler Building. The publishing house was officially incorporated in 1918, with Alfred Knopf as president, Blanche Knopf as vice president, and Samuel Knopf as treasurer.

From the start, Knopf focused on European translations and high-brow works of literature. Among their initial publications were French author Émile Augier's Four Plays, Ukrainian writer Nikolai Gogol's Taras Bulba, Polish novelist Stanisław Przybyszewski's novel Homo Sapiens, and French writer Guy de Maupassant's Yvette, a Novelette, and Ten Other Stories. During World War I these books were cheap to obtain and helped establish Knopf as an American firm publishing European works. Their first bestseller was a new edition of Green Mansions, a novel by W. H. Hudson which went through nine printings by 1919 and sold over 20,000 copies. Their first original American novel, The Three Black Pennys by Joseph Hergesheimer, was published in 1917.

1920s 

With the start of the 1920s Knopf began using innovative advertising techniques to draw attention to their books and authors. Beginning in 1920, Knopf produced a chapbook, for the purpose of promoting new books. The Borzoi was published periodically over the years, the first being a hardback called the Borzoi and sometimes quarterly as the Borzoi Quarterly. For Floyd Dell's coming-of-age novel, Moon-Calf, they paid men to walk the streets of the financial and theatre districts dressed in artist costumes with sandwich boards. The placards had a copy of the book for browsing and directed interested buyers to local book shops.

The unique look of their books along with their expertise in advertising their authors drew Willa Cather to leave her previous publisher Houghton Mifflin to join Alfred A. Knopf. As she was still under contract for her novels, the Knopfs suggested publishing a collection of her short stories, Youth and the Bright Medusa in 1920. Cather was pleased with the results and the advertisement of the book in The New Republic and would go on to publish sixteen books with Knopf including their first Pulitzer prize winner, One of Ours.

Before they had married, Alfred had promised Blanche that they would be equal partners in the publishing company, but it was clear by the company's fifth anniversary that this was not to be the case. Knopf published a celebratory 5th anniversary book in which Alfred was the focus of anecdotes by authors and Blanche's name was only mentioned once to note that "Mrs. Knopf" had found a manuscript. This despite ample evidence from authors and others that Blanche was in fact the soul of the company. This was covered extensively in The Lady with the Borzoi by Laura Claridge.

In 1923 Knopf also started publishing periodicals, beginning with The American Mercury, founded by H. L. Mencken and George Jean Nathan, which it published through 1934.

1923 also marked the year that Knopf published Kahlil Gibran's The Prophet. Knopf had published Gibran's earlier works which had disappointing sales. In its first year, The Prophet only sold 1,159 copies. It would double sales the next year and keep doubling becoming one of the firm's most successful books. In 1965 the book sold 240,000 copies.
Approaching it's 100 year anniversary in 2023 The Prophet has been translated into over 100 Languages and to date has never gone out of print for Knopf. 

In the 1920s, Knopf sometimes withdrew or censored their books when threatened by John Sumner, such as Floyd Dell's Janet March or George Egerton's 1899 translation of Hunger.

1930s 

Samuel Knopf died in 1932. William A. Koshland joined the company in 1934, and worked with the firm for more than fifty years, rising to take the positions of president and chairman of the board. Blanche became president in 1957 when Alfred became chairman of the board, and worked steadily for the firm until her death in 1966. Alfred Knopf retired in 1972, becoming chairman emeritus of the firm until his death in 1984. Alfred Knopf also had a summer home in Purchase, New York.

1940s 
Following the Good Neighbor policy, Blanche Knopf visited South America in 1942, so the firm could start producing texts from there. She was one of the first publishers to visit Europe after World War II. Her trips, and those of other editors, brought in new writers from Europe, South America, and Asia. Alfred traveled to Brazil in 1961, which spurred a corresponding interest on his part in South America. Penn Publishing Company was acquired in 1943. The Knopfs' son, Alfred "Pat" Jr., was hired on as secretary and trade books manager after the war.

1950s 
In 1952, editor Judith Jones joined Knopf as an editor. Jones, who had discovered Anne Frank: Diary of a Young Girl while working at Doubleday, acquired Julia Child's Mastering the Art of French Cooking for Knopf. Jones would remain with Knopf, retiring in 2011 as a senior editor and vice-president after a career that included working with John Updike and Anne Tyler.

Pat Knopf left his parents' publishing company in 1959 to launch his own, Atheneum Publishers, with two other partners. The story made the front page of The New York Times.

In a 1957 advertisement in The Atlantic Monthly, Alfred A. Knopf published the Borzoi Credo. The credo includes a list of what Knopf's beliefs for publishing including the statement that he never published an unworthy book. Among a list of beliefs listed is the final one—"I believe that magazines, movies, television, and radio will never replace good books."

Acquisition by Random House 
In 1960 Random House acquired Alfred A. Knopf. It is believed that the decision to sell was prompted by Alfred A. Knopf Jr., leaving Knopf to found his own book company, Atheneum Books, in 1959.

Since its founding, Knopf has paid close attention to design and typography, employing notable designers and typographers including William Addison Dwiggins, Harry Ford, Steven Heller, Chip Kidd, Lorraine Louie, Peter Mendelsund, Bruce Rogers, Rudolf Ruzicka, and Beatrice Warde. Knopf books conclude with an unnumbered page titled "A Note on the Type", which describes the history of the typeface used for the book. In addition, Knopf books date the year of the book's current printing on the title page.

Knopf published textbooks until 1988, when Random House's schools and colleges division was sold to McGraw Hill.

In 1991, Knopf revived the "Everyman's Library" series, originally published in England in the early 20th century. This series consists of classics of world literature in affordable hardcover editions. The series has grown over the years to include lines of Children's Classics and Pocket Poets.

Random House was acquired by Bertelsmann AG in 1998. In late 2008 and early 2009, the Knopf Publishing Group merged with Doubleday to form the Knopf Doubleday Publishing Group. Random House has been owned since its 2013 merger of Penguin Group by Penguin Random House, a joint venture between Bertelsmann (53%) and Pearson PLC (47%).

Many of Knopf's hardcover books are published later as Vintage paperbacks. Vintage Books is a sister imprint of Random House.

In October 2012, Bertelsmann entered into talks with rival conglomerate Pearson plc, over the possibility of combining their respective publishing companies, Random House and Penguin Group. The merger was completed on 1 July 2013 and the new company is Penguin Random House. Bertelsmann owns 53% of the joint venture while Pearson owns 47%. At the time of the acquisition the combined companies controlled 25% of the book business, with more than 10,000 employees and 250 independent publishing imprints and with about $3.9 billion in annual revenues. The move to consolidate was to provide leverage against Amazon.com and battle the shrinking state of bookstores.

In 2015, Knopf celebrated its 100th anniversary by publishing a commemorative book, Alfred A. Knopf, 1915–2015: A Century of Publishing.

Notable people

Notable editors and publishers 
While there have been many notable editors at Knopf there have only been four editors-in-chief: Alfred A. Knopf, Sr., Robert Gottlieb, Sonny Mehta (who died in 2019) and Reagan Arthur. Other influential editors at Knopf included Harold Strauss (Japanese literature), Herbert Weinstock (biography of musical composers), Judith Jones (culinary texts), Peter Mendelsund (art director and book cover designer) as well as Angus Cameron, Charles Elliott, Gary Fisketjon, Lee Goerner, Ashbel Green, Carol Brown Janeway, Michael Magzis, Anne McCormick, Nancy Nicholas, Daniel Okrent, Regina Ryan, Sophie Wilkins, and Victoria Wilson. Knopf also employed literary scouts to good advantage.

Notable authors 

Alfred A. Knopf has published thousands of books from thousands of authors, including Albert Camus, John Banville, Carl Bernstein, Elizabeth Bowen, Frederick Buechner, Robert Caro, Willa Cather, Julia Child, Bill Clinton, Miguel Covarrubias, Joan Didion, Bret Easton Ellis, James Ellroy, Martin Gardner, Kahlil Gibran, Lee H. Hamilton, Kazuo Ishiguro, John Keegan, Anne Rice, Nella Larsen, Jack London, Gabriel García Márquez, Cormac McCarthy, Toni Morrison, Haruki Murakami, Christopher Paolini, Edgar Allan Poe, Ezra Pound, Dorothy Richardson, Stephen M. Silverman, Oswald Spengler, Susan Swan, Anne Tyler, Andrew Vachss, James D. Watson, and Elinor Wylie.

Awards

Logo 
The logo for Knopf is a Russian wolfhound or Borzoi. Blanche Knopf suggested the Borzoi for the logo to imply motion and the logo was used on both the spine and the title page of their books.

References

Sources cited

External links 

Alfred A. Knopf, Inc. Records, 1873-1996 at the Harry Ransom Center at the University of Texas at Austin
The Borzoi 1920: being a sort of record of five years' publishing

 
Book publishing companies based in New York (state)
Publishing companies based in New York City
Publishing companies established in 1915
1915 establishments in New York City
1960 mergers and acquisitions
Random House